Rumford is a hamlet in Cornwall, England. Rumford is in the civil parish of St Ervan. The telephone area code for Rumford is 01841.

References

Hamlets in Cornwall